Rezagahi (also Romanized as Reẕāgāhī; also known as Reẕāgāh and Reza Gāhī Rodeh-ye Chūmeh) is a village in Jazireh-ye Minu Rural District, Minu District, Khorramshahr County, Khuzestan Province, Iran. At the 2006 census, its population was 22, in 4 families.

References 

Populated places in Khorramshahr County